Elena Liashenko ( Olena Anatoliyivna Liashenko; ; born 9 August 1976) is a Ukrainian former competitive figure skater. She is a three-time European medalist (silver in 2004, bronze in 1995 and 2005) and won nine medals on the Grand Prix series, including three golds (1998 Skate Canada International, 2003 Cup of Russia, and 2003 Cup of China). She competed at four Olympics.

Personal life 
Liashenko was born on 9 August 1976 in Kiev, Ukrainian SSR. In the summer of 2005, she married Ukrainian pentathlete Andriy Yefremenko, the brother of Galina Efremenko's husband. In 2007, they had a son, Platon.

Career 
Liashenko started skating at the age of four-and-a-half. She placed tenth at the 1993 World Junior Championships in Seoul, South Korea.

In the 1993–94, Liashenko placed 11th at the 1993 Skate Canada International and stepped onto her first senior national podium, taking silver at the Ukrainian Championships. In January 1994, she placed 19th at the European Championships in Copenhagen, Denmark. In February, she qualified for the free skate at her first Winter Olympics and went on to finish 19th in Lillehammer, Norway. She concluded her season in March with a 6th-place finish at the 1994 World Championships in Chiba, Japan, having placed sixth in all segments.

In the 1994–95 season, Liashenko won silver at the 1994 Nations Cup in Germany and repeated as the national silver medalist. She won her first ISU Championship medal, bronze, at the 1995 Europeans in Dortmund. She finished ninth at the 1995 Worlds in Birmingham, after placing sixth in the short program and tenth in the free skate.

In the 1995–96 season, Liashenko competed in the inaugural Champions Series (later known as the Grand Prix series) and won her first national title.

Liashenko is a four-time Olympian. She finished in the top ten at nine World Championships. Her highest finish was sixth, in 1994 and 2002. She retired after the 2005/2006 season due to recurring injury. Her injuries became a problem after the national championships. She withdrew from the 2006 European Championships, but managed to compete at the Olympics. She retired afterwards.

After retiring from competition, Liashenko began coaching young children in Kyiv. In August 2014, she began coaching young children at HC PZ Kraso Kladno in Kladno, Czech Republic.

Programs

Competitive highlights 
GP: Champions Series / Grand Prix

References

External links 

 
 Liashenko fan page (Figure Web)

Olympic figure skaters of Ukraine
Figure skaters at the 1994 Winter Olympics
Figure skaters at the 1998 Winter Olympics
Figure skaters at the 2002 Winter Olympics
Figure skaters at the 2006 Winter Olympics
1976 births
Living people
Sportspeople from Kyiv
Ukrainian female single skaters
European Figure Skating Championships medalists
Competitors at the 2001 Goodwill Games